Selma George is an Indian film singer in Malayalam cinema during the 1970s. She sang in 40 films, and her most popular song was "Saradindu Malardeepa" from the 1979 film, Ulkadal. She is the daughter of famous singer Pappukutty Bhagavathar. She is a recipient of the Kerala Sangeetha Nataka Akademi Award in Light Music category (2011).

Personal life
She was born the only daughter to famous singer Pappukutty Bhagavathar and Baby at Vyppinkara, Ernakulam. She completed her studies in Carnatic music from the RLV College of Music and Fine Arts, at Tripunithara. Her brother Mohan Jose is an actor in Malayalam movies. She married Malayalam film director K. G. George on 7 February 1977 at the St. Mathias Church in Chennai. They have a son, actor Arun, and a daughter, Thara.

Filmography
 Jagadeeshwari Jayajagadeeshwari ...	Devi Kanyaakumaari	1974
 Jagadeeshwari Jayajagadeeshwari [F] ...	Devi Kanyaakumaari
 Pattudayaada ...	Vrindaavanam	1974
 Malayattoor Malayumkeri ...	Thomasleeha	1975
 Maanum Mayilum ...	Agnipushpam	1976
 Chingakkulirkaatte ...	Agnipushpam	1976
 Pranayamalarkkaavil ...	Mallanum Mathevanum	1976
 Ethethu Ponmalayil ...	Ozhukkinethire	1976
 Paarayidukkil Mannundo ...	Thulavarsham	1976
 Maadathakkili ...	Thulavarsham	1976
 Achan Naaleyorappooppan ...	Aayiram Janmangal	1976
 Gange priya ...	Kaamalola	1977
 Oro Poovum Viriyum Pulari Pon ...	Vyaamoham	1978
 Prethabhoomiyil Naavukal ...	Iniyaval Urangatte	1978
 Maarathoru ...	Onappudava	1978
 Devi Bhagavathi ...	Mannu	1978
 Paadiyathonnum Paattalla ...	Thurakkoo Oru Vaathil	1978
 Pooja Madhuvinu ...	Soundaryam	1978
 Ente kadinjool pranaya ...	Ulkadal	1979
 Sharadindu Malardeepa ...	Ulkadal	1979
 Neelakkuda Choodi Maanam ...	Mela	1980
 Bharatha Muniyoru Kalam Varachu ...	Yavanika	1982
 Machaanethedi ...	Yavanika	1982
 Mookathayude souvarnam ...	Lekhayude Maranam Oru Flashback	1983
 Prabhaamayi ...	Lekhayude Maranam Oru Flashback	1983
 Enneyunarthiya Pularkalathil [Kannillathe Nizhal Paambukal] ...	Lekhayude Maranam Oru Flashback	1983
 Kanneeraattil mungi ...	Adaaminte Variyellu	1984
 Neelakkurinjikal Poothu ...	Kadhaykku Pinnil	1987

References

External links

 Selma George at MSI

Malayalam playback singers
Indian women playback singers
Singers from Kochi
Year of birth missing (living people)
Living people
Film musicians from Kerala
Indian women classical singers
20th-century Indian singers
20th-century Indian women singers
Women musicians from Kerala
Women Carnatic singers
Carnatic singers
Recipients of the Kerala Sangeetha Nataka Akademi Award